This is a list of songs that reached number one on the Billboard magazine Streaming Songs chart in 2017.

Chart history

See also
2017 in American music
List of Billboard Hot 100 number-one singles of 2017

References

United States Streaming Songs
Streaming 2017